Defending champion Gordon Reid and his partner Alfie Hewett defeated the other two-time defending champion Stéphane Houdet and his partner Nicolas Peifer in the final, 7–5, 6–4 to win the men's doubles wheelchair tennis title at the 2017 US Open.

There was no edition of the event in 2016 due to a scheduling conflict with the 2016 Summer Paralympics.

Seeds

Draw

Bracket

References
Draw

Wheelchair Men's Doubles
U.S. Open, 2017 Men's Doubles